On Anotha Level is the only studio album by American West Coast hip hop group Anotha Level. It was released on April 26, 1994 through Priority Records.

Background
Anotha Level was composed of five members: Bambino, Ced Twice, Stenge, Stix and Stones. The group was discovered by Ice Cube, who then got the group a deal with his label Priority Records. The album was executive produced by Ice Cube and Laylaw, with actual production handled by Laylaw, D-Maq and group members Stix and Stones. In addition, Ice Cube was featured on the track "Level-N-Service" and The Pharcyde was featured on "Phat-T".

Despite the involvement from Ice Cube, the album was not a commercial success. It peaked at No. 60 on the U.S. Billboard Top R&B/Hip-Hop Albums on May 28, 1994 and stayed on the chart for nine weeks. It also made it to No. 17 on the Heatseekers Albums chart. The group disbanded later in the year after making their final appearance on the Street Fighter soundtrack.

Track listing

Notes
 All songs written by Anotha Level, Lay Law & D-Maq except "Let Me Take Ya" written by Anotha Level, Lay Law, D-Maq & Don Jagwarr, and "Level-N-Service" written by Anotha Level, Lay Law, D-Maq, & Ice Cube.
 All lyrics rapped and written by Bambino, Ced Twice & Stenge

Personnel 
 Bambino – main artist, performer
 Ced Twice – main artist, performer
 Stenge – main artist, performer
 Stix – main artist, co-producer
 Stones – main artist, co-producer
 O'Shea Jackson – featured artist (track 12), executive producer
 The Pharcyde – featured artists (track 15)
 Larry Goodman – additional vocals (track 10), mixing, producer, executive producer
 Don Jagwarr – additional vocals (track 2)
 Angela Randle – additional vocals (track 10)
 Tino McIntosh – scratches
 Derrick McDowell – mixing, producer
 Michael Calderon – mixing, engineering
 Bob Moore – mixing, engineering
 Wally Traugott – mastering
 Art Shoji – art direction
 Sherry Etheredge – photography

Charts

References

External links

1994 debut albums
Priority Records albums
Albums produced by Laylaw